Francisco Lozano Vicente (4 October 1922 – 8 June 2006) was a Spanish politician who served as Minister of Housing of Spain between 1975 and 1977.

References

1922 births
2006 deaths
Housing ministers of Spain